The Grand Junction Railroad Bridge is a steel plate girder bridge carrying the Grand Junction Railroad over the Charles River in Boston, connecting the Boston University campus to Cambridgeport. In September 2009, the Commonwealth of Massachusetts finalized an agreement to purchase several CSX rail lines in eastern Massachusetts, including the Grand Junction tracks from the Beacon Park Yard in Allston, through Cambridge. The deal was closed on June 17, 2010.

Repairs

On November 21, 2012, the Grand Junction Railroad Bridge was closed to all rail traffic due to its poor condition. The bridge reopened in early January 2013, but was closed again in March for major structural repairs, reopening again in June.

See also

List of crossings of the Charles River

References

External links

 
Photo of locomotive wreck on Cambridge side of Grand Junction bridge in 1937, when it had two tracks.

Bridges in Boston
Buildings and structures in Cambridge, Massachusetts
Bridges in Middlesex County, Massachusetts
Bridges in Norfolk County, Massachusetts
Railroad bridges in Massachusetts
Bridges over the Charles River
Steel bridges in the United States
Plate girder bridges in the United States
1927 establishments in Massachusetts
Bridges completed in 1927